Struggling Souls (German: Ringende Seelen) is a 1918 German silent drama film directed by Eugen Illés.

It was shot at the Tempelhof Studios in Berlin. The film's sets were designed by the art director Kurt Richter.

Cast
 Gilda Langer as Gerda Vanini, die Tänzerin
 Werner Hollmann as von Sandenstein
 Martha Angerstein-Licho as Doris, geb. Amberg, seine Frau

References

Bibliography
 Alfred Krautz. International directory of cinematographers, set- and costume designers in film, Volume 4. Saur, 1984.

External links

1918 films
Films of the German Empire
German silent feature films
Films directed by Eugen Illés
German drama films
1918 drama films
UFA GmbH films
German black-and-white films
Silent drama films
1910s German films